Microstoma is a genus of cup fungi in the order Pezizales.

References

Pezizales genera
Sarcoscyphaceae